The Sisters of St. Francis of Penance and Christian Charity is a Roman Catholic religious congregation for women. A third order secular group, the sisters are not cloistered nuns but active in the world, having historically been primarily involved in teaching, although they have participated in the care of the sick and poor, hospital work, mission work, and other activities.

History
The international congregation was founded by Mother Magdalen (Catherine) Daemen (1787–1858) in 1835 in the town of Heythuysen in the Netherlands.   The Sisters were asked by Jesuit priests in Buffalo to come and serve the Roman Catholic families of German descent who were living there.  In 1874, the first three missionary sisters, accompanied by General Superior Mother Aloysia Lenders, arrived in Buffalo, New York.  The Sisters began serving in the Roman Catholic Diocese of Buffalo.  There are now ten provinces, worldwide, with the central administration in Rome, Italy.

Provinces

Generalate (Central administration) - Rome, Italy
St. Francis Province - Redwood City, California, USA
Sacred Heart Province - Denver, Colorado, USA
Holy Name Province - Stella Niagara Education Park, Lewiston, New York, USA
Province of Divine Providence - Heythuysen, Netherlands
Christ the King Province - Ludinghausen, Germany
Mary Immaculate Province - Nonnenwerth, Germany
Mary Help of Christians Province - Orlik, Poland
St. Clare Mission - Tanzania, East Africa
Holy Trinity Province - Indonesia
Sacred Heart of Jesus Province; Immaculate Heart of Mary Province; and Our Lady of Providence Province - São Paulo, Brazil
Holy Name Province - Chiapas, Mexico

The province in Tanzania is designated as an international mission.

Additional ministries
The Sisters of St. Francis of Stella Niagara (Holy Name Province, USA) additionally minister in the American states of Ohio, West Virginia, New Jersey, and Florida.  They also operate a school, convent, peace site, and hospitality center in New York State.  The school is known as Stella Niagara Education Park.

International ministries of the congregation exist in other countries throughout the world.  Currently these are located in Argentina, Belarus, East Timor, Guatemala, and Mexico.

See also
Catholic Church
St. Francis of Assisi
Third Order of St. Francis

References

External links
Sisters of St. Francis of Penance and Christian Charity: St. Francis Province, Redwood, CA
Sisters of St. Francis of Penance and Christian Charity: Holy Name Province, Stella Niagara, NY
Sisters of St. Francis of Penance and Christian Charity: Leudinghausen, Germany
Sisters of St. Francis of Penance and Christian Charity: Orlik, Poland

Catholic female orders and societies
Congregations of Franciscan sisters
Religious organizations established in 1835
Catholic religious institutes established in the 19th century
1835 establishments in the Netherlands